Cruel and Unusual is a four-issue American comic book mini-series created in 1999 by Jamie Delano and Tom Peyer (writers), John McCrea (penciller) and Andrew Chiu (inker), and published by Vertigo.

Synopsis
America's struggling prison system is turned over to TV producers, who exploit everything possible for profit, making reality shows of the prisoners and even hosting live executions.

Collected editions
The series has been collected into a trade paperback:
 Cruel and Unusual (112 pages, softcover, Desperado Publishing, September 2007)
 Cruel and Unusual (Italian language) (128 pages, hardcover, Green Comm Services, August 2013)

Notes

References

1999 comics debuts